Albemarle is a small city and the county seat of Stanly County, North Carolina, United States. The population was 15,903 in the 2010 Census.  Gerald R. "Ronnie" Michael (a former police chief in the city) serves as Mayor and Albemarle has a seven-member City Council elected in a combination of at-large and district seats. Albemarle has operated under the Council-Manager form of government since 1962.  Michael Ferris has served as City Manager since December 2014 and previously served as Assistant City Manager for nearly two decades. The City Manager is appointed by the City Council, and is responsible for the day-to-day administration of City government. The City's Department Heads report directly to the City Manager, who is also responsible for development and administration of the City's annual budget.

History

Etymology
This place-name is derived from the English surname Albemarle. According to a 1905 publication by the United States Geologic Survey, based on research by University of North Carolina - Chapel Hill history professor Kemp P. Battle, it was named specifically for General George Monck, the first Duke of Albemarle and one of the original proprietors of the colony of Carolina, which included the town.

Ancient and colonial
The site of modern-day Albemarle was originally peopled by small tribes of hunter-gatherers and mound builders whose artifacts and settlements have been dated back nearly 10,000 years. Large-scale European settlement of the region came in the mid-18th century via two primary waves: immigrants of Dutch, Scots-Irish and German descent moved from Pennsylvania and New Jersey seeking enhanced religious and political tolerance, while immigrants of English backgrounds came to the region from Virginia and the Cape Fear River Basin in Eastern North Carolina.

In early English colonial times, the Albemarle area was politically part of the New Hanover Precinct, out of which the Bladen Precinct was created in 1734. The renamed Bladen County was subdivided to create Anson County in 1750, which in turn spawned Montgomery County in 1779.

Establishment of Stanly County and Albemarle

The Albemarle region's first post office was established in 1826; it was then known as Smith's Store. The nearby crossroads of the Old Turnpike Road from Fayetteville to Salisbury and the Old Stage Road connecting Charlotte and Raleigh emerged as an important hub for regional commerce and trade. The region remained part of Montgomery County until 1841, when after years of attempted separation, prominent residents of the increasingly populous areas west of the Yadkin/Pee Dee River system successfully petitioned the North Carolina General Assembly for the establishment of Stanly County as an independent entity.  	 
			
Soon after the new county was formed, its Board of Commissioners was tasked with establishing a permanent county seat within eight miles (13 km) of the home of Eben Hearne (the County's first sheriff), and with laying out a new town, in which a courthouse would be erected. Nehemiah Hearne's heirs donated  from his plantation near the intersection of the Old Turnpike and Old Stage Roads for the construction of the new County Seat. The County Commissioners established the town's boundaries, laid out streets and surveyed and marked parcels of property within Hearne's donated land. The first land lot sale financed the new town's public buildings and paid some part of the elected officials' salaries. The courthouse was erected in 1842 and used for 50 years. The City of Albemarle was formally incorporated in 1857. The town was named for Albemarle County, the first county established in North Carolina, which was in turn named for the Duke of Albemarle, George Monck, one of the Lords Proprietors granted the province of Carolina in 1663 by King Charles II.

Economic history
The Albemarle region's early economic growth was fueled by agriculture (with cotton as the primary crop), regional mercantile trade and a short-lived gold rush in the nearby Uwharrie Mountains, all later supplanted by textile manufacturing. The Efird Manufacturing Co. (later American and Efird Mills) opened its first mill in Albemarle in 1896, and was followed soon thereafter by the Wiscasset Mill Company, the Cannon Mill Company, the Lillian Knitting Mill and others. In 1899, Wiscassett Mills Company established Cabarrus Bank and Trust, the first bank in Albemarle. By 1910, an electrical distribution plan for the city was underway.

The Yadkin Railroad began rail service to Albemarle from Salisbury in 1891. In 1911, the Winston-Salem Southbound Railway (WSS) constructed its own line through Albemarle to support the booming textile and market, eventually driving the Yadkin Railroad into obsolescence. The WSS still provides freight service through Albemarle, but since 1933 there has been no passenger service to the city. The Old Market Street Station on the WSS line has been restored, and is now the site of a popular farmer's market. The railbed of the Yadkin Railroad has been ripped up and paved over, though a one-mile (1.6 km) segment of its route south of Albemarle now serves as a hiking trail in Rock Creek Park.

In 1923, a state contract was let to construct NC-24/27 to Charlotte, the first paved highway out of Albemarle. In 1950, Stanly County Memorial Hospital opened on land donated by Wiscassett Mills.

Historic preservation

Albemarle was recognized by the National Trust for Historic Preservation as a National Main Street City in 1993. There are a number of historic preservation and adaptive reuse projects in its downtown that have been recently completed or are underway, including an initiative to create a greenway linking many of the City's parks and historic sites. The Freeman-Marks House, probably built during the 1820s, is the oldest known surviving house in Albemarle. It is listed in the National Register of Historic Places, along with the Romanesque Revival Opera House/Starnes Jewelers Building (1908) and three small historic districts in the city's downtown area. Another important historic property is the Isaiah W. "Buck" Snuggs House, an antebellum home on Third Street then owned and now named for a Stanly County sheriff who lost his leg in the Civil War Battle of Spotsylvania Court House. The Stanly County Museum in Albemarle provides a focal point for regional historic research and preservation.

The Albemarle Graded School-Central Elementary School, Thomas Marcellus Denning House, Downtown Albemarle Historic District, Five Points Historic District, Opera House-Starnes Jewelers Building, Pee Dee Avenue Historic District, Second Street Historic District, and Isaiah Wilson Snugs House are listed on the National Register of Historic Places.

Geography

The city is centered on the junction of U.S. Route 52 and the duplexed NC-24/27 in the Piedmont Region of North Carolina. Its topography is characterized by rolling, eroded hills, deciduous forests, and fast-running, narrow, shallow streams that feed the Yadkin/Pee Dee River Basin. Little Long Creek and Town Creek are the major non-seasonal streams through Albemarle; both flow generally southward into the Long and Big Bear Creek Sub-basin.

Geology
Albemarle is located in the Floyd Church Formation of the Carolina Slate Belt. Thickly bedded, axially cleaved meta-mudstone and meta-argillite are common in this formation, interbedded with meta-sandstone, meta-conglomerate and meta-volcanic rock. Biotite is the most prevalent Paleozoic metamorphic rock in the region.

Climate
Albemarle has a humid subtropical climate (Köppen climate classification Cfa), with cool to mild winters and hot, humid summers.

Demographics

2020 census

As of the 2020 United States census, there were 16,432 people, 6,220 households, and 4,108 families residing in the city.

2010 census
As of the census of 2010, there were 15,489 people, 6,291 households, and 4,158 families residing in the city. The population density was 999.0 people per square mile (385.6/km). There were 6,954 housing units at an average density of 443.1 per square mile (171.0/km). The racial makeup of the city was 72.85% White, 20.50% African American, 0.24% Native American, 4.16% Asian, 0.03% Pacific Islander, 1.07% from other races, and 1.14% from two or more races. Hispanic or Latino people of any race were 1.87% of the population.

There were 6,291 households, out of which 30.6% had children under the age of 18 living with them, 47.8% were married couples living together, 14.4% had a female householder with no husband present, and 33.9% were non-families. 30.4% of all households were made up of individuals, and 14.4% had someone living alone who was 65 years of age or older. The average household size was 2.42 and the average family size was 3.02.

In the city, the population was spread out, with 26.0% under the age of 18, 8.4% from 18 to 24, 26.9% from 25 to 44, 21.3% from 45 to 64, and 17.4% who were 65 years of age or older. The median age was 37 years. For every 100 females, there were 87.6 males. For every 100 females age 18 and over, there were 82.4 males.

The median income for a household in the city was $31,442, and the median income for a family was $41,729. Males had a median income of $31,001 versus $20,589 for females. The per capita income for the city was $17,511. About 11.8% of families and 15.7% of the population were below the poverty line, including 21.6% of those under age 18 and 10.8% of those age 65 or over.

Parks and recreation

Albemarle's Parks and Recreation Department was established in 1963. It currently operates and administers five parks within the city's limits, as well as a soccer complex and a ceramics facility. The newest facility under the Department's purview is City Lake, a  park on a  lake that was opened in 2003, joining Rock Creek Park, Chuck Morehead Memorial Park, Roosevelt Ingram Memorial Park and Don Montgomery Memorial Park.

Morrow Mountain State Park is a large state park located east of the city.  It is situated on a high elevation in the Uwharrie Mountains adjoining the Yadkin River, and offers many recreational activities. The park features a natural history museum and the restored 19th-century home site of Dr. Francis J. Kron.

Education

 Albemarle High School
 Stanly Community College

Media
Albemarle and its environs are served by the Stanly News and Press, which was founded in 1880 and is currently owned by Boone Newspapers, Inc. The Weekly Post is a newspaper focusing on local community events in the area. Albemarle is also within the outer coverage and delivery area of The Charlotte Observer

Albemarle and Stanly County are served by two local radio stations, WSPC at 1010 AM with a news/talk format, and WZKY at 1580 AM with an oldies music format. Both are owned by Stanly Communications, Inc.  WSPC was previously known as WABZ AM in a former bank at 108 East North Street, across the street from the First Baptist Church.

Television stations available are from the Charlotte Designated Market Area, which Stanly County and Albemarle are a part of.  Additionally, the local cable provider carries one station from Greensboro, WFMY-TV.

Notable people
 Denico Autry, football defensive end for the Tennessee Titans of the NFL; he attended Albemarle High School
 W. Horace Carter, Pulitzer Prize-winning journalist
 Louis Cato, multi-instrumentalist and bandleader of The Late Show Band, the house band for The Late Show with Stephen Colbert
 Willie Drye, journalist and author
 Woody Durham, radio play-by-play announcer for the Carolina Tar Heels; started his radio career at radio station WZKY 1580 AM in Albemarle
 Stuart Daniel Baker, better known as Unknown Hinson, musician and voice actor
 Danny Kepley, former all-star linebacker for the Canadian Football League Edmonton Eskimos; member of the Canadian Football Hall of Fame
 T.A. McLendon, football running back, holds several national high school records; starred for the North Carolina State Wolfpack; played at Albemarle High School
 Monty Montgomery, former Major League Baseball player
 Kellie Pickler, 2006 American Idol contestant; country recording artist; three-time Stanly County AIDS Rodeo for Charity Champion (2002-2004); Season 16 winner of Dancing with the Stars (2013)
 Tommy Smith, former Major League Baseball player
 June Tyson, musician-singer and first female member of Sun Ra and his Arkestra

See also
 USS Albemarle (AV-5)

References

External links
 

 
Cities in North Carolina
Cities in Stanly County, North Carolina
County seats in North Carolina
Populated places established in 1826
1826 establishments in North Carolina
George Monck, 1st Duke of Albemarle